Elections were held in the Regional Municipality of Halton of Ontario on October 22, 2018 in conjunction with municipal elections across the province.

Halton Regional Council

Halton Regional Chair
The following are the results for the position of Halton Regional Chair.

Burlington
The following are the results for Burlington.

Mayor

Regional & City Councillors

Six Regional & City Councillors were elected in 1 of 6 wards on Burlington City Council.

Source:

Halton Hills
The following are the results for Halton Hills.

Mayor

The results for Halton Hills Town Council are as follows:

Regional Councillors
Two Regional Councillors were elected in 1 of 2 wards.

Local Councillors
Eight Local Councillors were elected in 1 of 4 wards (2 from each ward).

Milton
The following are the results for Milton.

For 2018, Milton reduced the number of councillors from 11 to 9. This consequently resulted in 4 Regional Councillors and 4 Local Councillors being elected.

Mayor

The results for Milton Town Council are as follows:

Regional Councillors
Four Regional Councillors were elected in 1 of 4 wards.

Local Councillors
Four Local Councillors were elected in 1 of 4 wards.

Oakville
List of candidates:

Mayor

Oakville Town Council
The size of Oakville's council has been increased from 13 members to 15 and has necessitated the creation of a seventh ward.

Town and Regional Council

Town Council

References 

Halton
Regional Municipality of Halton